D Records was an American record label located in Houston, Texas, United States. It was founded by Pappy Daily. The label closed in 1965, though George Strait recorded his first songs under the label's name from 1978-1980 until he signed to MCA Records in 1981.  Daily also owned the Dart record label.

Discography
 The Complete D Singles Collection, Vol. 1 (15832 Bear Family, 1995)

Artists

The Big Bopper
Doug Bragg
Eddie Bond
Merle Kilgore
Bill Carter
Jimmy & Johnny
Ray Campi
Tommy Wood
Johnny "Country" Mathis
Jack Lionel
Jerry Lynn
Eddie Noack
Benny Barnes
Byron Johnson
Eddie Burke
Glenn Barber
Merl Lindsay
Joe Jackson
Johnny Dollar
Willie Nelson
Claude Gray
Fitz Morris

References

American record labels
Record labels disestablished in 1965